Amara is a large genus of carabid beetles, commonly called the sun beetles.  Many are holarctic, but a few species are neotropical or occur in eastern Asia.

These ground beetles are mostly black or bronze-colored, and many species have a characteristic "bullet-shaped" habitus, as shown in the photos, making them taxonomically difficult for a beginner. They are predominantly herbivorous, with some species known to climb ripening grasses to feed on the seeds.  Other species are used as weed control agents. Numerous species are adventive in non-native habitats, particularly species that thrive in synanthropic settings.

Gallery

Subgenera
The following are subgenera of Amara:

 Acorius Zimmermann, 1831
 Allobradytus Iablokoff-Khnzorian, 1975
 Amara Bonelli, 1810
 Amarocelia Motschulsky, 1862
 Amathitis Zimmermann, 1831
 Ammoleirus Tschitscherine, 1899
 Ammoxena Tschitscherine, 1894
 Armatoleirides Tanaka, 1957
 Atlantocnemis Antoine, 1953
 Bradytodema Hieke, 1983
 Bradytulus Tschitscherine, 1894
 Bradytus Stephens, 1827
 Camptocelia Jeannel, 1942
 Celia Zimmermann, 1832
 Cribramara Kryzhanovskij, 1964
 Cumeres Andrewes, 1924
 Curtonotus Stephens, 1827
 Eoleirides Tschitscherine, 1898
 Harpaloamara Baliani, 1934
 Harpalodema Reitter, 1888
 Heterodema Tschitscherine, 1894
 Hyalamara Tschitscherine, 1903
 Leiocnemis Zimmermann, 1831
 Leiramara Hieke, 1988
 Leirides Putzeys, 1866
 Leiromorpha Ganglbauer, 1891
 Leironotus Ganglbauer, 1892
 Leuris Lutshnik, 1927
 Microleirus Kryzhanovskij, 1974
 Neopercosia Hieke, 1978
 Paracelia Bedel, 1899
 Paraleirides Sainte-Claire Deville, 1906
 Parapercosia Tschitscherine, 1899
 Percosia Zimmermann, 1832
 Phaenotrichus Tschitscherine, 1898
 Phanerodonta Tschitscherine, 1894
 Polysitamara Kryzhanovskij, 1968
 Pseudoamara Baliani, 1934
 Pseudocelia Lutshnik, 1935
 Pseudoleirides Kryzhanovskij, 1968
 Pseudoleiromorpha Hieke, 1981
 Reductocelia Lafer, 1989
 Shunichius Habu, 1972
 Xanthamara Bedel, 1899
 Xenocelia Hieke, 2001
 Zabrocelis Putzeys, 1866
 Zezea Csiki, 1929

See also
 List of Amara species

References

 Haghebaert, G. (1989). Coleoptera from marine habitats, in: Wouters, K.; Baert, L. (Ed.) (1989). Proceedings of the Symposium "Invertebrates of Belgium". pp. 301–308

Further reading

External links

Amara Bonelli 1810

 
Pterostichinae
Carabidae genera
Taxa named by Franco Andrea Bonelli
Articles containing video clips